The City of Auckland by-election of 1895 was a by-election held on 24 July 1895 during the 12th New Zealand Parliament in the urban seat of the City of Auckland.

The contest was won by Thomas Thompson of the Liberal Party. Thompson convincingly beat the conservative candidate Richard Monk recording nearly a two thousand vote majority.

Background
The by-election was triggered due to the resignation of sitting MP George Grey. Thomas Thompson was the Liberal Party candidate. His sole opponent was Richard Monk, previous Waitemata MP from 1886  to 1890, then from 1893 to 9 February 1894 when his election was declared void.

Results
The following table gives the election results:

Thompson represented the seat until he retired as an MP in 1899. In 1903 he was elevated to sit in the Legislative Council until his term ended on 17 March 1917.

Notes

References

Auckland 1895
1895 elections in New Zealand
Politics of the Auckland Region
1890s in Auckland